The 2019 Football Championship of Chernivtsi Oblast was won by FC Voloka.

League table

References

Football
Chernivtsi
Chernivtsi